The 2019 East Tennessee State Buccaneers football team represents East Tennessee State University (ETSU) in the 2019 NCAA Division I FCS football season and are in the fourth year of their second stint as football members of the Southern Conference (SoCon). They are led by second-year head coach Randy Sanders and play their home games at William B. Greene Jr. Stadium.

Previous season

The Buccaneers finished the 2018 season 8–4, 6–2 in SoCon play to win a share of the SoCon championship. They received an at-large bid to the FCS Playoffs, where they lost to Jacksonville State in the first round.

Preseason

Preseason media poll
The SoCon released their preseason media poll and coaches poll on July 22, 2019. The Buccaneers were picked to finish in third place in both polls.

Preseason All-SoCon Teams
The Buccaneers placed seven players on the preseason all-SoCon teams.

Offense

1st team

Quay Holmes – RB

2nd team

Ben Blackmon – OL

Tre'mond Shorts – OL

Defense

1st team

Jason Maduafokwa – DL

Nasir Player – DL

Tyree Robinson – DB

2nd team

Jeremy Lewis – DB

Schedule

Game summaries

at Appalachian State

Shorter

VMI

Austin Peay

at Furman

Wofford

at Chattanooga

at Samford

The Citadel

at Western Carolina

Mercer

at Vanderbilt

References

East Tennessee State
East Tennessee State Buccaneers football seasons
East Tennessee State Buccaneers football